Mitsutaka Goto (後藤 光尊, born July 27, 1978 in Hachirōgata, Akita) is a Japanese former professional baseball infielder in Japan's Nippon Professional Baseball. He played with the Orix BlueWave/Buffaloes and Tohoku Rakuten Golden Eagles.

External links

NPB.com

1978 births
Living people
Asian Games medalists in baseball
Asian Games silver medalists for Japan
Baseball players at the 1998 Asian Games
Japanese baseball coaches
Japanese baseball players
Medalists at the 1998 Asian Games
Nippon Professional Baseball coaches
Nippon Professional Baseball second basemen
Nippon Professional Baseball shortstops
Nippon Professional Baseball third basemen
Orix BlueWave players
Orix Buffaloes players
Baseball people from Akita Prefecture
Tohoku Rakuten Golden Eagles players